GOV.UK Verify is an identity assurance system developed by the British Government Digital Service (GDS). On 28 October 2022, it was announced that it was being closed down, with no new accounts being allowed from mid-December 2022 and with all Verify services being closed down by April 2023.
The system was intended to provide a single trusted login across all British government digital services, verifying the user’s identity in 15 minutes. It allowed users to choose one of several companies to verify their identity to a standard level of assurance before accessing 22 central government online services.

History

The Cabinet Office started work on the system in 2011, when it was known as the Identity Assurance Programme (IDAP). A private beta phase began in February 2014, moving into public beta on 14 October 2014. The system was declared live on 24 May 2016.

In June 2018, it was announced that the responsibility for digital ID policy had moved from GDS to the Department for Digital, Culture, Media & Sport. Responsibility for development and rollout of GOV.UK Verify remained with GDS.

Certified companies
Third-party companies are responsible for carrying out identity verification within the scheme. The first five companies – known as identity providers (IdPs) – that signed up to provide the service through a tender issued by the Department for Work & Pensions were the Post Office, Verizon, Experian, Digidentity and Mydex CIC. After a further tender issued by the Cabinet Office in 2014, Barclays, GB Group, Morpho and Royal Mail became certified companies.

While Mydex CIC participated in the original tender process, it did not go on to become a certified GOV.UK identity provider. In 2016 Verizon was temporarily and then permanently removed from the list of certified providers.

In October 2018, GDS announced that five of the seven identity providers – Barclays, Digidentity, Experian, Post Office and SecureIdentity – had signed contracts for a further 18 months. Users of Citizensafe from GB Group and Royal Mail's identity service would be able to continue using their GOV.UK Verify identity for twelve months but would need to set up a new account through one of the other five companies. On 24 March 2020, Barclays stopped providing new GOV.UK verify digital identities, and both SecureIdentity and Experian subsequently also pulled out of providing identities for both new and existing customers. This left only two providers: Post Office and Digidentity. The Post Office depends on Digidentity infrastructure to operate as an identity provider.

Level of assurance
GOV.UK Verify certified companies must verify customers' identities to level 2 as defined by Good Practice Guide 45 published jointly by CESG and the Cabinet Office. This level of identity assurance is intended to be sufficient to support a claim in a civil court.

List of connected services
The following 22 services were connected to GOV.UK Verify :

By October 2022, only five of those services were still using Verify:

Use beyond central government

Local government
GDS worked with local authorities since 2013 to pilot the use of GOV.UK Verify by local government. Local government services piloted as of July 2017 included applying for free bus passes and 'blue badge' disabled parking permits.

Private sector
From the outset, GDS had intended GOV.UK Verify use to be extended to the private sector. While work was underway in 2017, this was still not in place in October 2018 when the GDS head Kevin Cunnington announced that "GOV.UK Verify is now mature enough for us to take it to the next stage – opening it up beyond the private sector for the private sector to take the lead".

Cunnington announced that five of the identity providers had signed contracts for a further 18 months, after which the scheme would not receive further funding from government. The development of the scheme would instead be in the hands of the private sector.

NHS
GOV.UK Verify was one of the options considered by the National Health Service for its citizen identity solution. In November 2018 the NHS announced that it was pursuing its own app-based solution, but was looking for a way to enable people who have a GOV.UK Verify account to use it to log in to NHS systems.

International 
Work was underway to enable non-British citizens to access the service from September 2018.

GOV.UK Verify was designed with interoperability with the ID schemes of other EU states as part of the eIDAS scheme. On 28 August 2018, GOV.UK Verify took its first step towards enabling British residents to use their GOV.UK Verify account to log on to online public services in other EU countries. The scheme was 'notified' on 2 May 2019.

Criticism
GOV.UK Verify has not met various targets that GDS set for it:
The platform was originally due to launch in 2012, but did not do so until 2016.
The success rate in verifying individuals was 47% as of October 2018.

It does not meet all the identity requirements of government departments, such as identifying intermediaries or businesses.

The Infrastructure and Projects Authority (IPA) reviewed Verify in July 2018, noting the department's reluctance to continue funding the project, with another report later that year requesting the GOV.UK Verify identity assurance programme should be terminated.

In October 2018, Jo Platt, the Shadow Minister for the Cabinet Office, said that £130 million had been spent on developing GOV.UK Verify.

Evolution
In December 2018, GDS announced that over the next 18 months they would be working with standards bodies, identity providers and the private sector to:
 Make the standards easier to follow and use
 Accept more types of identity evidence
 Remove barriers to reuse of digital identities across the public and private sector
 Make better use of government data to help people prove who they are online
 Open up the market based on a standards-based approach
Computer Weekly expressed concern over this approach in August 2019.

In April 2020, funding for GOV.UK Verify was extended by 18 months due to the COVID-19 pandemic. In August 2020, trade association TechUK criticised the Government's progress since 2019 as being slow and opaque. In April 2021, the platform was extended by a further two years.

HMRC ceased to use Verify, which had been available for a limited number of online services in parallel with Government Gateway sign-in, with effect from April 2022.

On 28 October 2022, it was announced that it was being closed down, with no new accounts being allowed from mid-December 2022 and with all Verify services being closed down by April 2023.

The Government Digital Service is developing a replacement service, the One Login For Government.

See also
Digital identity
Electronic authentication
Federated identity
Government Gateway
Identity management
National Strategy for Trusted Identities in Cyberspace (US equivalent initiative)
Open Identity Exchange
Privacy by design
Strong authentication

Further reading

References

External links
 Introducing GOV.UK Verify
 Video showing how GOV.UK Verify works
 GOV.UK Verify on Twitter
 GOV.UK Verify blog
 GOV.UK Verify performance dashboard
 Identity Assurance Programme briefing paper - National Audit Office
 Investigation into Verify, March 2019 - National Audit Office

Identity management
Identity management initiative
Federated identity
Identity management systems
Computer access control
E-government in the United Kingdom
Government Digital Service